Jackie Robinson (1919–1972) was the first African-American Major League Baseball player of the modern era.

Jackie Robinson may also refer to:
Jackie Robinson (basketball, born 1927), American basketball player in the 1948 Summer Olympics
Jackie Robinson (basketball, born 1955), American professional basketball player and businessman
Jackie Robinson (footballer) (1917–1972), British footballer who played for Sheffield Wednesday and Sunderland
Jackie Robinson (musician), Jamaican singer and lead vocalist with The Pioneers
Jackie Robinson (miniseries), a 2016 documentary film directed by Ken Burns

See also
Jack Robinson (disambiguation)
John Robinson (disambiguation)

Robinson, Jackie